Dizoniopsis apexclarus is a species of sea snail, a gastropod in the family Cerithiopsidae. It was described by Rolán, in 2007.

References

Cerithiopsidae
Gastropods described in 2007